RoboCop Versus The Terminator is a four-issue comic book crossover limited series published in 1992 by Dark Horse Comics. It was written by Frank Miller and drawn by Walt Simonson.

Plot
Using elements from both the RoboCop and Terminator universes, the comic book series begins with Skynet sending three Terminators back in time to Detroit to protect a troubled RoboCop from a lone human soldier also sent back to destroy him.

Discovering that the technology used to build him is partly responsible for the future development of Skynet, RoboCop sets out to take down Skynet in the post-apocalyptic future single-handedly.  Part of the story focuses on his mind, the only part left of him, hiding and moving throughout Skynet's systems, fighting back as best he can.

RoboCop's human consciousness (Alex Murphy) waits for decades in hiding deep within Skynet's "consciousness", avoiding detection as the slaughter of humanity takes place. He waits for the opportunity when Skynet's attention will be focused on other matters with the war against the humans for him to make a move. A human assault allows Murphy to create a Terminator body that resembles his old form. He makes his escape and is nearly destroyed by human resistance fighters. He identifies himself as an ally and, after gaining their confidence, begins to plot to destroy Skynet with them.

Human allies
As the planning continues, the humans devise a final assault on the central location where Skynet is being housed. They realize that they do not have the manpower to complete their assault. One of the humans asks RoboCop how he was able to build his body. Upon explaining how he accomplished this, the human asks him why he could not do the same thing many times over. The group begins their assault on the Skynet compound and it is evident that they will not succeed when a buzzing is heard from behind them. The original RoboCop has succeeded in not only replicating, but improving himself. A swarm of flying RoboCops (in a different fashion than in RoboCop 3) descend upon the battle and turn the tide. While the battle rages on outside the facility, the original RoboCop sneaks into the facility and shuts down Skynet. He then surrounds himself in a blob of the human flesh that covers the Terminators in order to travel back to the past before the appearance of the original Terminators.

Upon the appearance of the strange blob in the present, the people are confused and then terrified as the metal RoboCop tears forth from the mass of flesh and immediately blasts off into space. He finds the earliest iteration of Skynet (which in this story is a spy satellite) and destroys it. Upon the explosion of the satellite, he immediately disappears as the caption explains that this version of RoboCop would never have existed without Skynet.

The story ends with the RoboCop of modern times feeling a sense of peace without any inner turmoil from the beginning of the story, returning to the police headquarters for a much-needed rest.

Film Adaptation
Plans for a "Terminator vs Robocop" film have been on and off in the works since 1990. Although no movie has yet to be made with the crossover, several video games and comic books have been released based on the idea, making the project one of the most anticipated crossovers of all time.

Video game

A video game loosely based on the comic was released for the Sega Mega Drive/Genesis, Sega Master System, Super Nintendo Entertainment System, Sega Game Gear, and the Nintendo Game Boy. A platformer tie-in game for the Nintendo Entertainment System was also produced, but was ultimately cancelled; the ROM for it has since been distributed online. The Genesis version was awarded Bloodiest Game of 1993 by Electronic Gaming Monthly.

Collected editions
The four issues, including stiff cardboard inserts intended as pull-out cut-outs, were bound together with a new cover as an "exclusive" collection by Diamond Comics. This version is long out of print.

In February 2014, Dark Horse announced that two collected editions of the series would be released the following July: a standard hardcover edition, and a "gallery edition" reproducing the original art at full size.

See also
 Terminator/RoboCop: Kill Human

References

External links
 Dark Horse.com: RoboCop Versus Terminator #1
 RoboCop Versus Terminator Archive
 Terminator versus Robocop.trilogy (mashup)

Crossover comics
Dark Horse Comics limited series
Intercompany crossovers
RoboCop comics
Terminator (franchise) comics
Comics by Frank Miller (comics)
Comics by Walt Simonson
1992 comics debuts
1992 comics endings

ja:ロボコップVSターミネーター
fi:RoboCop vs. The Terminator